Us and the Night is the sixth studio album by American rock band 3 Doors Down, released on March 11, 2016. It is 3 Doors Down's first studio album since Time of My Life (2011), marking the longest gap between two studio albums in their career, and the band's first album with Chet Roberts on lead guitar and Justin Biltonen on bass. The album received mixed reviews from critics. Us and the Night debuted at number 14 on the Billboard 200 chart and had three singles: "In the Dark", "Still Alive", and "The Broken".

Background
In June 2015, Chris Henderson announced that the new album would be titled Us and the Night. The release date was announced on January 7, 2016.

Reception

Critical reception

Us and the Night garnered mixed reviews from music critics. At Metacritic, which assigns a normalized rating out of 100 to reviews from mainstream critics, the album received an average score of 51, based on 4 reviews.

AllMusic's Stephen Thomas Erlewine noted how the album was "a brighter affair than Time of My Life", giving credit to the band for favoring "wide strokes over specificity" with their lyrical content and instrumentation, concluding that "[T]his contradiction means the band remains an uneasy good time, but at least on Us and the Night the reconstituted 3 Doors Down have decided to look on the sunny side of life." Jessica Thomas from Renowned for Sound commented about the overall feel throughout the record's track listing: "While there’s nothing necessarily bad or unpleasant about its content or delivery, there just isn’t anything new or exciting either. Each track falls into the rut of being entirely too similar, and from the thematic material to production, there’s just too much familiarity to discern from one track to the next." Consequence of Sound writer Adam Kivel also gave a critique on the band's lyricism throughout the album: "Arnold’s lyrics latch onto tired tropes and clichéd rhymes, rather than offering any sort of narrative or emotional specificity. None of the songs are terrible, but none of them make much of an impression."

Commercial performance
The album debuted at number 14 on the Billboard 200 album chart, number two on Top Rock Albums, and number one on the Independent Albums chart, with 24,000 copies sold on its first week of release.

Track listing

Personnel
Band members
 Brad Arnold – lead vocals
 Chet Roberts – lead guitar, backing vocals
 Chris Henderson – rhythm guitar, backing vocals
 Justin Biltonen – bass
 Greg Upchurch – drums

Chart performance

Weekly charts

Year-end charts

Singles

References

3 Doors Down albums
2016 albums
Republic Records albums